is a passenger railway station on the Musashino Line located in Sakura-ku, Saitama, Japan, operated by the East Japan Railway Company (JR East).

Lines
It is located 27.8 kilometers from Fuchūhommachi Station.

Station layout

The station consists of an elevated island platform serving two tracks (2 and 3), with the station building located underneath. Additional tracks (1 and 4) outside the platforms tracks are used by freight trains and Musashino services to and from the Tōhoku Main Line. The station is staffed.

Platforms

History
The station opened on 1 April 1973.

Passenger statistics
In fiscal 2019, the station was used by an average of 14,758 passengers daily (boarding passengers only).

Surrounding area
 
 Akigase Park

See also
List of railway stations in Japan

References

External links

 JR East station information 

Railway stations in Saitama Prefecture
Railway stations in Japan opened in 1973
Stations of East Japan Railway Company
Railway stations in Saitama (city)
Musashino Line